Neil Stanley Maddison (born 2 October 1969) is an English football coach, former professional footballer and co-commentator. He is the academy ambassador and player welfare officer at Middlesbrough.

As a player, he was predominantly a central midfield who notably played in the Premier League for Southampton and Middlesbrough, before going on to play in the Football League with Barnsley, Bristol City and Darlington. 

He would initially remain with Darlington following the end of his playing career and worked in a variety of roles at the club, as well as managing the first team on a temporary basis on three occasions. He has since worked with the Middlesbrough academy and has co-commentated on games for BBC Tees since the start of the 2013–14 season.

Playing career

Maddison signed as a trainee with Southampton in 1984 and stayed with them until 1997 when he made a £250,000 transfer to Middlesbrough where he spent time on loan to Bansley and Bristol City (where he scored once against Oldham Athletic). Then he went back to his home town club, Darlington. From there he has gone on to coach the youth team in Darlington and also has a role in the club's centre of excellence.

Coaching career
On 30 September 2006, David Hodgson was suspended by the club following a run of poor results and a possible approach from AFC Bournemouth, leaving Maddison and Martin Gray as joint caretakers for up to two weeks while an internal investigation was carried out. He remained in charge until Dave Penney was appointed on 30 October. On 5 January 2007, Darlington agreed to end Maddison's playing contract so he could concentrate on being youth coach full-time.

In February 2008, after Mick Tait had left Darlington, Maddison took over the role as reserve team coach with Craig Liddle taking the role of youth team coach.

On 8 May 2009, it was reported that Darlington's administrators, Brackenbury Clark and Company, had released the majority of the first team squad from their contracts to cut costs, with immediate effect, as well as the club's coaching staff and administrative staff including the caretaker manager Martin Gray, leaving Liddle and Maddison as joint temporary caretaker managers. They remained in these posts until Colin Todd was appointed on 20 May.

In May 2009, Maddison was appointed Darlington's centre of excellence manager.

After Todd was dismissed from Darlington, Maddison was appointed to assist Liddle as temporary caretaker assistant manager as Liddle was appointed caretaker manager.

On 5 October 2009, the former Republic of Ireland manager Steve Staunton took over as the new permanent manager until the end of that season with the former Sunderland coach Kevin Richardson as his assistant. On 21 March 2010, Maddison joined Liddle as caretaker yet again after the sacking of Staunton, before Simon Davey was appointed manager on 1 April.

Since September 2018, Maddison has worked for Middlesbrough as their academy ambassador and player welfare officer.

Media career
Maddison has worked for BBC Tees as a co-commentator on Middlesbrough games.

Career statistics

References

External links

1969 births
Living people
Footballers from Darlington
English footballers
Association football defenders
Southampton F.C. players
Middlesbrough F.C. players
Barnsley F.C. players
Bristol City F.C. players
Darlington F.C. players
Premier League players
English Football League players
English football managers
Darlington F.C. managers
English Football League managers